The Voronezh-Kastornoye operation was an offensive operation by the Red Army during the Russian Civil War in October and November 1919, which was successfully carried out by parts of the 8th and 13th Army, which formed the left wing of the Southern Front.

Plans 
After the failure of the White Advance on Moscow in August 1919, the Red Army had launched a successful counteroffensive. In October 1919, the command of the Southern Front, led by Alexander Yegorov, had designed a plan to
 strike at the flank of the Cossack Shock Group of General Denikin,
 destroy the main cavalry units of the Don and Volunteer Armies,
 capture the city of Voronezh,
 achieve favorable conditions for the dismemberment of Denikin's front and the launch of a subsequent offensive to the rear of the White troops in the direction of the cities of Oryol and Kursk.

The main attack was to be inflicted by the 1st Cavalry Corps of Semyon Budyonny in the direction of Voronezh and Kastornoye, in order to crush the White 4th Don Corps and the 3rd Kuban Corps, and create favorable conditions for the 8th Army to reach the Don River.

The course of the operation 
On October 13, units of Budyonny's Cavalry Corps entered into battle with Mamontov’s Cavalry Corps near the village of Moskovskoye. The battle raged until October 19, and the village changed hands several times. On October 19, the cavalry corps of Andrei Shkuro and Mamantov struck at the junction of the Red 4th and 6th Cavalry Divisions in the direction of the village of Khrenovoe. Budyonny repulsed the attack and pushed the White troops back to the eastern outskirts of Voronezh. 

On October 23, the 1st Cavalry Corps, in cooperation with the 12th and 15th Rifle Divisions of the 8th Army, launched an offensive towards Voronezh and, after fierce battles, seized the city on October 24. On October 26, the 33rd Rifle Division of the 8th Army occupied the city of Liski on the Don, thereby pushing the 3rd Don Corps over the river Don. 
On October 29, the 42nd Rifle Division of the 13th Army captured Dolgorukovo. On October 31, the corps of Budyonny was reinforced by the reserve 11th Cavalry Division. On November 2, Mamantov's corps counterattacked in the area of Klevna-Shumeyka, but retreated after suffering heavy losses. 
On November 3, the 42nd Rifle Division occupied Livny and began to advance towards Kastornoye. Kastornoye station was reached on November 5 by the Cavalry Corps of Budyonny and troops of the 8th and 13th armies. 

In a new counterattack, troops of the White Army retook Liski, Talovaya, Novokhopyorsk and Bobrov. This created a threat that the Whites would reoccupy Voronezh. From 5 to 15 November, the 42nd Rifle and 11th Cavalry Divisions from the North, the 12th Rifle and 6th Cavalry Divisions from the South and the 4th Cavalry Division from the East, under cover of a serious snowstorm, launched a new attack and seized Kastornoye. By the end of November 16, the area was clear of Whites troops. On November 19, the Cavalry Corps of  Budyonny was expanded into the 1st Cavalry Army.

Consequences 
In the course of the operation, Soviet troops advanced up to 250 kilometers, defeated the main forces of the White cavalry and, threatening the flank and rear of the Volunteer Army, contributed to their defeat in the Orel–Kursk operation.

The Voronezh–Kastornoye operation is the first battle during the Russian Civil War with massive use of large cavalry formations.

See also 
 Orel–Kursk operation

References

Works cited 
 
 Voronezh-Kastornoy operation 1919 - article from the Great Soviet Encyclopedia.

Literature 
 Nikolai Nikolaevich Azovtsev. Encyclopedia "Civil War and Intervention in the USSR" / S.S. Khromov .. - 1983. - P. 114-115. - 702 s.

Battles of the Russian Civil War
Conflicts in 1919
October 1919 events